The 1997 PPG/Firestone Indy Lights Championship Powered By Buick consisted of 13 races. Tony Kanaan edged out good friend and teammate Hélio Castro-Neves to the title by only four points.

Calendar

Race summaries

Homestead race
Held March 2 at Homestead-Miami Speedway. Hélio Castro-Neves won the pole.

Top Five Results
 David Empringham
 Fredrik Larsson
 Chris Simmons
 Mark Hotchkis
 Lee Bentham

Long Beach race
Held April 13 at Long Beach, California Street Course. Hélio Castro-Neves won the pole.

Top Five Results
 Hélio Castro-Neves
 Cristiano da Matta
 Mark Hotchkis
 Chris Simmons
 Tony Kanaan

Nazareth race
Held April 27 at Nazareth Speedway. Chris Simmons won the pole.

Top Five Results
 Cristiano da Matta
 Chris Simmons
 Fredrik Larsson
 Hélio Castro-Neves
 Tony Kanaan

Savannah race
Held May 18 on Hutchinson Island. Hélio Castro-Neves won the pole.

Top Five Results
 Hélio Castro-Neves
 Sérgio Paese
 Lee Bentham
 Luiz Garcia Jr.
 Naoki Hattori

Gateway race
Held May 24 at Gateway International Raceway. Chris Simmons won the pole.

Top Five Results
 Lee Bentham
 Cristiano da Matta
 Hélio Castro-Neves
 David Empringham
 Chris Simmons

Milwaukee race
Held June 1 at The Milwaukee Mile. Clint Mears won the pole.

Top Five Results
 Clint Mears
 David Empringham
 Tony Kanaan
 Cristiano da Matta
 Fredrik Larsson

Detroit race
Held June 8 at Belle Isle Raceway. Tony Kanaan won the pole.

Top Five Results
 Tony Kanaan
 Hélio Castro-Neves
 Geoff Boss
 David Empringham
 Sérgio Paese

Portland race
Held June 22 at Portland International Raceway. Hélio Castro-Neves won the pole.

Top Five Results
 Hideki Noda
 Hélio Castro-Neves
 Tony Kanaan
 Cristophe Tinseau
 Cristiano da Matta

Toronto race
Held July 20 at Exhibition Place. Tony Kanaan won the pole.

Top Five Results
 Hélio Castro-Neves
 Tony Kanaan
 David Empringham
 Didier André
 Cristophe Tinseau

Trois-Rivières race
Held August 3 at the Trois-Rivières, Quebec Street Circuit. Mark Hotchkis won the pole.

Top Five Results
 Tony Kanaan
 Mark Hotchkis
 Cristophe Tinseau
 Cristiano da Matta
 David Empringham

Vancouver race
Held August 31 at Pacific Place. Cristiano da Matta won the pole.

Top Five Results
 Cristiano da Matta
 Tony Kanaan
 Hideki Noda
 Chris Simmons
 David Empringham

Laguna Seca race
Held September 7 at Mazda Raceway Laguna Seca. Tony Kanaan won the pole.

Top Five Results
 Cristiano da Matta
 Tony Kanaan
 Hélio Castro-Neves
 Mark Hotchkis
 Lee Bentham

Fontana race
Held September 27 at The California Speedway. Clint Mears won the pole.

Top Five Results
 Clint Mears
 Chris Simmons
 Lee Bentham
 Cristiano da Matta
 Hélio Castro-Neves

Final points standings

Driver

For every race the points were awarded: 20 points to the winner, 16 for runner-up, 14 for third place, 12 for fourth place, 10 for fifth place, 8 for sixth place, 6 seventh place, winding down to 1 points for 12th place. Additional points were awarded to the pole winner (1 point) and to the driver leading the most laps (1 point).

Complete Overview

R23=retired, but classified NS=did not start NQ=did not qualify

References 

Indy Lights seasons
Indy Lights Season, 1997
Indy Lights
Indy Lights